The Milton–Madison Bridge (also known as the Harrison Street Bridge) is a continuous truss bridge that connects Milton, Kentucky and Madison, Indiana. It carries approximately 10,000 cars a day. The old structure was replaced with a completely new continuous truss which was constructed on temporary piers adjacent to the operational span between 2011 and 2012 and slid into place after demolition of the old span using a construction method called "truss sliding." The new crossing opened to vehicle traffic in April 2014, and a pedestrian sidewalk opened that October.

Description
This two lane vehicular bridge is the Ohio River crossing for U.S. Route 421. The new bridge has a -wide road bed, plus a  cantilevered pedestrian-only path. Bicyclists are banned from the sidewalk, but may use the new bridge's  shoulders.

The bridge provides the shortest distance between Indianapolis, Indiana, and Lexington, Kentucky.

History
Built by J.G. White Engineering Corp., construction was started in 1928, and completed in 1929, at the cost of $1,365,101.84. It was opened for traffic on December 20, 1929. Originally a toll bridge, on November 1, 1947 at noon the toll was removed.

In 1997 the bridge was refurbished. This was after a 1995 study which could not agree on a new bridge location, so $10 million was used for the refurbishment.

Replacement
The bridge was replaced in the first half of the 2010s, as the original bridge was "functionally obsolete" and "structurally deficient."  It had a sufficiency rating of 33 out of a possible 100; its superstructure condition rating was considered "poor". Modern trucks were unable to safely use the old bridge. One of the boons of the new bridge would be to aid a $20 million "resort and entertainment center" where a cotton mill once stood.

A Milton–Madison bridge study was begun by the Indiana Department of Transportation and Kentucky Transportation Cabinet on August 26, 2008. The study had to take in account the Madison Historic District, which is a National Historic Landmark, and the National Environmental Policy Act.

The Indiana Department of Transportation (INDOT), in a partnership with the Kentucky Transportation Cabinet (KYTC), designed a new bridge to replace the original bridge. The new project was headed mostly by INDOT. The bridge was removed except for several piers in the waterway, which were rehabilitated and widened to accommodate a new, wider steel-truss superstructure. Scour mitigation was also performed on the existing piers. The new bridge also features an ADA-compliant pedestrian walkway. Construction for the new bridge began in the fall of 2010, with the old bridge remaining open during work on the piers. Walsh Construction Company planned to close the bridge for only 10 days during construction rather than an anticipated year-long closure. The team used an innovative construction method called "truss sliding" to "slide" the  truss into place along steel rails and plates.

Emergency ferry service during the 2012 and 2014 bridge closure periods was provided by Madison, Indiana-based, Madison Milton Ferry LLC, in partnership with Anderson Ferry of Hebron, Kentucky. Passenger ferry service was provided by Madison based Rockin Thunder Jet Boat Rides LLC during the bridge closure for the final slide. In 15 days over 4000 passengers and 12 dogs were transported in a 6 passenger Jet Boat between Milton Kentucky and Madison Indiana.

The cost of the replacement was $103.7 million.

Incidents 
On March 11, 2014, only four days before the truss slide was scheduled to begin, construction workers were installing a mechanism to facilitate the slide when a steel bearing on the southeast corner of the bridge dislodged, causing the bridge to drop by at least  and injuring one worker. Work was conducted to replace the steel bearing ten days later and the bridge opened to traffic at 7:20 PM on April 17, 2014. The pedestrian path opened on October 30 of that year.

Gallery

See also
 
 
 
 
List of bridges documented by the Historic American Engineering Record in Indiana
List of bridges documented by the Historic American Engineering Record in Kentucky
 List of crossings of the Ohio River

References

External links
Official website of the construction project
Documentary about the construction project on YouTube
Milton–Madison Bridge at Bridges & Tunnels
Madison–Milton Bridge at Historic Bridges of the United States

Bridges completed in 1929
Buildings and structures demolished in 2013
Bridges completed in 2014
Bridges over the Ohio River
Historic American Engineering Record in Indiana
Historic American Engineering Record in Kentucky
Madison, Indiana
Continuous truss bridges in the United States
Transportation buildings and structures in Jefferson County, Indiana
Buildings and structures in Trimble County, Kentucky
Transportation in Trimble County, Kentucky
Road bridges in Indiana
Road bridges in Kentucky
U.S. Route 421
Bridges of the United States Numbered Highway System
Former toll bridges in Indiana
Former toll bridges in Kentucky
1929 establishments in Indiana
1929 establishments in Kentucky
2013 disestablishments in Indiana
2013 disestablishments in Kentucky
2014 establishments in Indiana
2014 establishments in Kentucky
Steel bridges in the United States
Interstate vehicle bridges in the United States